

Tunberht (died ) was a medieval Bishop of Lichfield.

Tunberht was consecrated between 841 and 845 and died between 857 and 862.

Notes

Citations

References

External links
 

9th-century English bishops
Anglo-Saxon bishops of Lichfield
860 deaths
Year of birth unknown